Biker poetry  is a movement of poetry that grew out of the predominantly American lifestyle of the biker and motorcycle clubs following World War II.

Background
Poets such as Hunter S. Thompson are credited with writing biker poetry, playing no small part in the genus by popularizing a literary movement that focused on the biker lifestyle when he released Hell's Angels: The Strange and Terrible Saga of the Outlaw Motorcycle Gangs.

Overview
Biker poetry often embraces form, and may include fixed verse, free verse, folk song, concrete poetry, poetry slam and even "Baiku", a form of Haiku. Notable biker poets include Diane Wakoski, who authored a collection known as The motorcycle betrayal poems. Writers such as Colorado T. Sky and K Peddlar Bridges work with experimental poetry, however the biker genre tends to work with form, especially rhyming verse. Groups such as The Highway Poets Motorcycle Club have an international membership. The genre is a regular feature in many motorcycle magazines and motorcycle rallies.

Biker poets often use pseudonyms. These include "The Holy Ranger" (Dr. Martin Jack Rosenblum), "Wild Bill, the Alaskan Biker Poet" (William B Rogers), "Ironhorse Writer" (Laurence P. Scerri), "Gypsypashn" (Betsy Lister), "Biker Jer" (Jerry Sawinski) and "Joe Go" (Jose Gouveia).

Themes

Biker Poetry is similar to cowboy poetry in that it can reflect a romantic American lifestyle. Verse will often focus on the loneliness or camaraderie associated with motorcycling, the day-to-day affairs of maintenance on the motorcycle, personal problems within a family that lives a biker lifestyle as well as substance abuse and its relation to bikers. Other popular  themes include "the freedom of the road", outlaw clubs, interactions with cars and trucks (also referred to as 'cages'), biker values and practices, and the conflicts and tragedies associated with highway incidents.

References

External links 
 Highway Poets Motorcycle Club
 Biker Poets and Writers Association 
 Road Poets of New York
 "Motorcycles and the art of poetic utterance", The Guardian16 November 2007

Motorcycle writing
Genres of poetry
Poetry movements
American literary movements
20th-century American literature